Stigmella tiliae is a moth of the family Nepticulidae. It is found in all of Europe, except the Balkan Peninsula and the Mediterranean Islands.

The wingspan is 4,2–5 mm. Adults are on wing from May to June and from July to August. There are two generations per year.

The larvae feed on Tilia alba, Tilia americana, Tilia cordata, Tilia x euchlora, Tilia platyphyllos, Tilia tomentosa, Tilia x vulgaris. They mine the leaves of their host. The mine consists of a gradually widening corridor.

External links
bladmineerders.nl
Swedish Moths

Nepticulidae
Moths of Europe
Moths described in 1856